Trevor Blackann is an American former lobbyist who pleaded guilty in the Jack Abramoff scandal. He began his political career as a staffer for Missouri Republican Roy Blunt.

As a staffer for U.S. Senator Kit Bond (R-MO), he met with Abramoff and other lobbyists in the Mariana Islands in November 2000. Abramoff charged the islands for this meeting. After leaving Bond to work as a lobbyist, Blackann went on a trip in Todd Boulanger's boat in the Chesapeake Bay.

On November 20, 2008, Blackann pleaded guilty to lying on his 2003 tax returns by concealing $4,100 in gifts from lobbyists. The lobbyists, identified as Lobbyist D and Lobbyist E in the plea agreement, are Team Abramoff associates Todd Boulanger and James Hirni. The gifts included a free trip to Game 1 of the 2003 World Series, which included airline travel to and from New York City, transportation around the city in a chauffeured sport utility vehicle, a ticket to the game, a souvenir baseball jersey, admission to and entertainment at a gentlemen's club following the game and free meals and drinks.

Family
Blackann's wife is Laura Brookshire, a former staffer for Tom DeLay.

References

Living people
American lobbyists
American people convicted of tax crimes
Place of birth missing (living people)
Year of birth missing (living people)
United States congressional aides
Washington, D.C., Republicans